The ambassador of the United States to the United Arab Emirates is the official representative of the president of the United States to the head of state of the United Arab Emirates (UAE).

The U.S. embassy to the UAE is located in Embassies District, Sector W59-02, Abu Dhabi.

History
The United Arab Emirates is a federation of seven emirates, each ruled by a Sheikh. Until 1971 the sheikhdoms had been protectorates of the United Kingdom, known as the Trucial States. On December 1, 1971 The UK ended its relationship with the Trucial States and the sheikhdoms became independent. On December 2 the seven sheikhdoms, under the leadership of Zayed bin Sultan Al Nahyan united to form the United Arab Emirates.

The United States recognized the independence of the United Arab Emirates the next day on 3 December 1971. Diplomatic relations were established on March 20, 1972, when Envoy William Stoltzfus presented his credentials to the government of the United Arab Emirates. Stoltzfus was concurrently accredited to Bahrain, Kuwait, Qatar, and Oman, and the UAE while resident at the U.S. Embassy in Kuwait. During Stolzfus’ tenure as non-resident Ambassador, the embassy in Abu Dhabi was established on May 15, 1972, with Philip J. Griffin as Chargé d'Affaires ad interim. The first ambassador solely accredited to the UAE was Michael Sterner, who presented his credentials on May 24, 1974.

Ambassadors

Notes

See also
United Arab Emirates – United States relations
Embassy of the United States, Abu Dhabi
Foreign relations of the United Arab Emirates
Ambassadors of the United States

References
United States Department of State: Background notes on the United Arab Emirates

External links 
 United States Department of State: Chiefs of Mission for the United Arab Emirates
 United States Department of State: United Arab Emirates
 United States Embassy in Abu Dhabi

United Arab Emirates
Main
United States